William Eastmead (died 1847?) was an English dissenting minister.

Life
Eastmead was pastor of a congregation at Kirkby Moorside, Yorkshire, and died about 1847.

Works
He wrote:
 ‘Observations on Human Life,’ London, 1814, 1825.
 ‘The Perfections of the Works of Christ.’ 
 ‘Historia Rievallensis; containing the History of Kirkby Moorside, and an Account of the most Important Places in its Vicinity. To which is prefixed a Dissertation on the Animal Remains and other Curious Phenomena in the recently discovered Cave at Kirkdale,’ Thirsk, 1824, pp. 488, dedicated to Francis Wrangham, archdeacon of Cleveland.

References

Attribution

Year of birth missing
1847 deaths
English Christian religious leaders
English Dissenters
19th-century English non-fiction writers
English religious writers
People from Ryedale (district)
19th-century Protestant religious leaders
Clergy from Yorkshire